Nanami Yanagawa (梁川奈々美; born January 6, 2002) is a former Japanese pop singer, a second generation member of Japanese girl group Juice=Juice and a member of Country Girls.

Biography
Nanami was born on January 6, 2002, in Kanagawa, Japan.

Overview
On November 5, it was announced at Country Girls' first anniversary event that she would be joining the group alongside Musubu Funaki.

On June 9, 2017, it was announced that Country Girls would be ceasing regular activities and that three of the members, including Nanami, would be transferring to other Hello! Project groups. On June 26, through a special episode of Hello! Project Station, it was revealed that Nanami would be joining Juice=Juice as a new second generation member alongside Ruru Dambara. She graduated from Hello! Project on March 11, 2019.

Hello! Project groups and units 
 Hello Pro Kenshuusei (2013–2015)
 Country Girls (2015–2019)
 Juice=Juice (2017–2019)

Discography
for Nanami Yanagawa's releases with Country Girls and Juice=Juice, see Country Girls (band)#Discography and Juice=Juice#Discography.

Filmography

References 

2002 births
Living people
People from Kanagawa Prefecture
Musicians from Kanagawa Prefecture
Juice=Juice members
Japanese women pop singers
Japanese idols